"There It Is" is a 1982 song by the American R&B and soul group Shalamar from their album, Friends. It is their highest charting single in the UK Singles Chart, along with "A Night to Remember", which both reached number 5. It reached number 6 in Ireland. The song was ranked at number 9 among the top ten "Tracks of the Year" for 1982 by NME.

Track listing

7" single

12" single

References

External links
 Shalamar - There It Is on Discogs
 Performance on TOTP on YouTube

1982 songs
1982 singles
Shalamar songs
SOLAR Records singles